Eleanor Cobham (c.1400 – 7 July 1452) was an English noblewoman, first the mistress and then the second wife of Humphrey, Duke of Gloucester, who in 1441 was forcibly divorced and sentenced to life imprisonment for treasonable necromancy, a punishment likely to have been  politically motivated.

Origins
Eleanor was the younger daughter of Sir Reginald Cobham (d.1445), who lived at Sterborough in Surrey, and his first wife, Eleanor Culpeper (d.1422), daughter of Sir Thomas Culpeper.

Mistress and wife to the Duke of Gloucester

In about 1422 Eleanor became a lady-in-waiting to Jacqueline d'Hainault, who, on divorcing John IV, Duke of Brabant, had fled to England in 1421. In 1423, Jacqueline married Humphrey, Duke of Gloucester, the youngest son of King Henry IV,  who since the death of his elder brother King Henry V was Lord Protector of the child king Henry VI and a leading member of his council.

Gloucester went to France to wrest control of his wife's estates in Hainault. On his return to England in 1425 Eleanor became his mistress. In January 1428, the Duke's marriage to Jacqueline was annulled and he married Eleanor. According to Harrison, "Eleanor was beautiful, intelligent, and ambitious and Humphrey was cultivated, pleasure-loving, and famous". Over the next few years they were the centre of a small but flamboyant court based at La Plesaunce in Greenwich, surrounded by poets, musicians, scholars, physicians, friends and acolytes. 

In 1435, Gloucester's elder brother, John, Duke of Bedford died, making Humphrey heir presumptive to the English throne. Gloucester also claimed the role of regent, hitherto occupied by his brother, but was opposed in that endeavour by the council.  His wife Eleanor had some influence at court and seems to have been liked by Henry VI.  In November 1435, Gloucester placed his whole estate in a jointure with Eleanor.  Six months later, in April 1436, she was granted the robes of a duchess for the Garter ceremony.

Trial and imprisonment

Eleanor consulted astrologers to try to divine the future. The astrologers Thomas Southwell and Roger Bolingbroke predicted that Henry VI would suffer a life-threatening illness in July or August 1441. When rumours of the prediction reached the king's guardians, they also consulted astrologers who could find no such future illness in their astrological predictions, a comfort for the king, who had been troubled by the rumours. They also followed the rumours to their source and interrogated Southwell, Bolingbroke and John Home (Eleanor's personal confessor), then arrested Southwell and Bolingbroke on charges of treasonable necromancy. Bolingbroke named Eleanor as the instigator but she had fled to sanctuary in Westminster Abbey so could not be tried by the law courts. The charges against her were possibly exaggerated to curb the ambitions of her husband.

Eleanor was examined by a panel of religious men whilst in sanctuary and she denied most of the charges but confessed to obtaining potions from Margery Jourdemayne, "the Witch of Eye". Her explanation was that they were potions to help her conceive.  Eleanor and her fellow conspirators were found guilty. Southwell died in the Tower of London, Bolingbroke was hanged, drawn and quartered, and Jourdemayne was burnt at the stake. Eleanor had to do public penance in London, divorce her husband and was condemned to life imprisonment. 

On three market days in November 1441 she was forced to walk barefoot to three churches. Market days were chosen as they were busy, to maximize the humiliation. The marriage of Eleanor to duke Humphrey was ended through an imposed divorce, stripping her of her titles and rights to any of the duke’s wealth.

A sentence of perpetual imprisonment was imposed. In 1442, Eleanor was imprisoned at Chester Castle, then in 1443 moved to Kenilworth Castle. This move may have been prompted by fears that Eleanor was gaining sympathy amongst the Commons, for just a few months prior an unnamed Kentish woman had met with Henry VI at Black Heath and scolded him for his treatment of Eleanor, saying he should bring her home to her husband.  The woman was punished by execution. In July 1446 Eleanor was moved to the Isle of Man, and finally in March 1449 to Beaumaris Castle in Anglesey, where she died on 7 July 1452.

Children
Eleanor's husband Humphrey had two known children, Arthur and Antigone. Sources are divided about whether they were born to Eleanor before the marriage, or were the offspring of an "unknown mistress or mistresses". K.H. Vickers, Alison Weir and Cathy Hartley all suggest that Eleanor was their mother, though other authors treat their maternity as unknown. Antigone, however, had her first child in November 1436 suggesting she was born at the very latest in 1424 which may suggest that she was born before Eleanor became involved with Humphrey. 
Thus, Eleanor's children may have been:
 Arthur Plantagenet (died after 1447)
 Antigone Plantagenet, who married Henry Grey, 2nd Earl of Tankerville, Lord of Powys (c. 1419–1450) and then John d'Amancier.

Notes

References

Further reading
  Royal Genealogical Data – University of Hull

1400s births
1452 deaths
Year of birth uncertain
House of Lancaster
Gloucester
Mistresses of English royalty
Female Shakespearean characters
15th-century English women
15th-century English people
People convicted of witchcraft
English ladies-in-waiting
Witch trials in England